was a town located in Satsuma District, Kagoshima Prefecture, Japan.

As of 2003, the town had an estimated population of 5,987 and the density of 74.70 persons per km2. The total area was 80.15 km2.

On October 12, 2004, Tōgō, along with the city of Sendai, the towns of Hiwaki, Iriki and Kedōin, and the villages of Kamikoshiki, Kashima, Sato and Shimokoshiki (all from Satsuma District), was merged to create the city of Satsumasendai.

Timeline 
 1952 - The village of Kami-Tōgō became the town of Tōgō.
 2004 - Tōgō, along with the city of Sendai, the towns of Hiwaki, Iriki and Kedōin, and the villages of Kamikoshiki, Kashima, Sato and Shimokoshiki (all from Satsuma District), was merged to create the city of Satsumasendai.

Transports

Road 
National Highway
 Route 267

Schools 
Junior High School
 Togo Junior High School
Elementary School
 Togo Elementary School
 Torimaru Elementary School
 Fujikawa Elementary School
 Noze Elementary School
 Yamada Elementary School

Notable people from Togo 
 Masakiyo Maezono (Football and Beach Soccer Player)

References 

Dissolved municipalities of Kagoshima Prefecture